The Dublin and South Eastern Railway 15 and 16 were a pair of 2-6-0 steam locomotives which were built for the heavy goods (freight) traffic on the Dublin to Wexford main line of the Dublin and South Eastern Railway (DSER).  The two locomotives were built by Beyer, Peacock and Company at their Gorton Foundry in Manchester.

On account of the risk of damage when new (during the Irish Civil War period of 1921–1922), both examples were initially sent to Belfast for safekeeping.  They were stored by the Great Northern Railway (Ireland) at Adelaide yard until 1923, when they were returned to the DSER. The locos were withdrawn in the early 1960s.

In 1925, the DSER was absorbed into the Great Southern Railways and the two locomotives were renumbered 461 and 462, and placed in Class 461 or Class K2.

Livery
Originally said to have been painted green, although the DSER's standard livery was lined black, on becoming part of the GSR, they were painted in the standard livery of unlined dark battleship grey which they retained until withdrawal.

Following withdrawal, 461 was repainted into a livery based on lined DSER black for display, while still owned by CIÉ. Under the RPSI, she was initially painted plain black with a 'flying snail', but more recently she has been outshopped in an unprototypical CIÉ lined green livery upon completion of her overhaul in 2011.

Preservation

Locomotive No. 461 was initially preserved by CIÉ in 1967, one of several engines to be put on display at various railway stations around Ireland following an appeal by the Irish Railway Record Society. Other locomotives put on display by CIÉ included ex-GNR 131 and ex-GSWR No. 90.

After being moved several times following display, 461 was presented by CIÉ to the RPSI in 1977. An extensive overhaul followed at Whitehead and the locomotive returned to traffic in late 1990. The locomotive completed an overhaul in 2011 at the RPSI's Whitehead base, and was operation in the Dublin area until 2018. She has also been used on some northern operations including one to Portrush and also some to Bangor. The locomotive is currently in store in Whitehead since late 2018, awaiting overhaul.

461 has appeared in theatrical film releases such as Michael Collins, Nora, and Angela's Ashes. She can be seen in an episode of Foyle's War.

While she did have some initial steaming problems after the last overhaul, it was later discovered this was due to incorrect firebar spacing at Whitehead (which a Dublin volunteer had previously corrected in its previous service period in the 1990s). Once rectified in Dublin, her performance improved dramatically.
No. 461 is the only surviving DSER locomotive.

See also
 Diesel Locomotives of Ireland
 Multiple Units of Ireland
 Coaching Stock of Ireland
 Steam locomotives of Ireland

References

External links

webpage for preserved K2 Class No.461

Beyer, Peacock locomotives
2-6-0 locomotives
Steam locomotives of Ireland
Steam locomotives of Northern Ireland
Railway locomotives introduced in 1922
5 ft 3 in gauge locomotives
1′C h2 locomotives